The Illustrious Prince is a 1919 American drama film directed by William Worthington and produced by Sessue Hayakawa's Haworth Pictures Corporation.

Plot

Cast
Sessue Hayakawa as Prince Maiyo (and the Prince's father)
Mabel Ballin as Penelope Morse
Harry Lonsdale as the Duke of Devenham
Beverly Traverse as the Duchess
Robert Lawler as Sir Charles Somerfield
Bertram Grassby as Count de la Mar
Toyo Fujita as Soto
Edward Peil as Inspector Jacks

References

External links 
 

Films directed by William Worthington
Haworth Pictures Corporation films
1919 drama films
1919 films
American silent feature films
American black-and-white films
Films based on British novels
Silent American drama films
Film Booking Offices of America films
1910s American films
Films with screenplays by Richard Schayer